Bryna Rebekah Kra (born 1966) is an American mathematician and Sarah Rebecca Roland Professor at Northwestern University who is on the board of trustees of the American Mathematical Society and was elected the president of American Mathematical Society in 2021. As a member of American Academy of Arts and Sciences and National Academy of Sciences, Kra has made significant contributions to the structure theory of characteristic factors for multiple ergodic averages. Her academic work centered on dynamical systems and ergodic theory, and uses dynamical methods to address problems in number theory and combinatorics.

Education and career
Kra was born in 1966 in Boston. She graduated with a bachelor's degree from Harvard University in 1988, and obtained her Ph.D. from Stanford University in 1995 under the guidance of Yitzhak Katznelson. She held postdoctoral positions at the Hebrew University in Jerusalem, the University of Michigan, the IHÉS and the Ohio State University before joining the mathematics faculty at Pennsylvania State University as an assistant professor. Since 2004 Kra has been a professor of mathematics at Northwestern University, where she was department chair from 2009 to 2012.

Book
With Bernard Host, Kra is the author of the book Nilpotent Structures in Ergodic Theory (Mathematical Surveys and Monographs 236, American Mathematical Society, 2018).

Honors
In 2010  Kra was awarded the Levi L. Conant Prize for her expository article "The Green–Tao theorem on arithmetic progressions in the primes: an ergodic point of view". In 2006 she was an invited speaker at the International Congress of Mathematicians in Madrid ("From combinatorics to ergodic theory and back again"), and was named an AMS Centennial Fellow the same year. In 2012 she became a fellow of the American Mathematical Society. From 2010 to 2014 she was a member of the executive committee of the American Mathematical Society, in 2014 she was elected to the executive committee of the Association for Women in Mathematics, and in 2015 she was elected to the board of trustees of the American Mathematical Society. In 2016 she became a fellow of the American Academy of Arts and Sciences. In 2019, she was elected to the National Academy of Sciences. She was named a 2021 Simons Fellows in Mathematics.  Kra was elected to the 2023 class of fellows of the Association for Women in Mathematics "for her vision and work creating programs to support women in mathematics, especially GROW (Graduate Research Opportunities for Women) and AWM student chapters; for her leadership in the mathematics community, including serving on the AWM Executive Committee and serving as president of AMS; and for making advocacy for women a priority throughout her career."

Family relations
Kra is the daughter of mathematician Irwin Kra.

References

External links
Homepage at Northwestern University
Portrait at Northwestern University

20th-century American mathematicians
21st-century American mathematicians
American women mathematicians
Living people
1966 births
Stanford University alumni
Harvard University alumni
Pennsylvania State University faculty
Northwestern University faculty
Fellows of the American Mathematical Society
Place of birth missing (living people)
University of Michigan faculty
Fellows of the American Academy of Arts and Sciences
Members of the United States National Academy of Sciences
20th-century women mathematicians
21st-century women mathematicians
20th-century American women
21st-century American women